The Ministry of Public Management Reforms is the Sri Lankan government ministry responsible “to ensure application of modern technologies and practices for results based Public Management through people’s friendly reform initiatives.”

List of ministers 

The Minister of Public Management Reforms is an appointment in the Cabinet of Sri Lanka.

Parties

See also 
 List of ministries of Sri Lanka

References

External links 
 Ministry of Public Management Reforms
 Government of Sri Lanka

Public Management Reforms
Public Management Reforms